The 1956 Cal Poly San Dimas Broncos football team represented the Cal Poly Kellogg-Voorhis Unit—now known as California State Polytechnic University, Pomona—as an independent during the 1956 NCAA College Division football season. Led by Bob Stull in his first and only season as head coach, Cal Poly San Dimas compiled a record of 6–2.
The team outscored its opponents 215 to 84 for the season.

Schedule

Notes

References

Cal Poly San Dimas
Cal Poly Pomona Broncos football seasons
Cal Poly San Dimas Broncos football